M-111 was the designation given to two former state trunklines in the U.S. state of Michigan:

M-111 (1928 Michigan highway) in the Bay City area
M-111 (1938 Michigan highway) in Keweenaw County